Muraltia orbicularis is a species of flowering plant from the genus Muraltia. The species is endemic to Cape Peninsula in South Africa.

References

Polygalaceae